Brad Foster (born 22 October 1997) is a British professional boxer who has held the British and Commonwealth super-bantamweight titles since 2019.

Early life 

Brad Foster was born on 22 October 1997 in Walsall, England. At the age of 9 he took up kickboxing. After winning multiple kickboxing championships including British, European and world titles, he turned to boxing aged 18.

Professional career 

Foster made his professional debut on 5 December 2015, winning a four round points decision over Josh O'Donnell at the Town Hall in Dudley, West Midlands.

In November 2016, he signed a three-year promotional contract with Frank Warren's Queensberry Promotions.

On 20 July 2018, He fought Leon Gower (6–0–0) for the vacant British Midlands Area super-bantamweight title at the Banks's Stadium in Walsall. Foster won the title via eighth-round stoppage.

His next fight came on 8 March 2019 against former British bantamweight champion Josh Wale (27–10–2) for the vacant British super-bantamweight title at the Barnsley Metrodome in Barnsley, Yorkshire. Foster captured the British title by unanimous decision, with the scorecards reading 119–111, 117–112 and 117–111.

On 18 May 2019, he challenged Commonwealth super-bantamweight champion Ashley Lane (13–8–2) at the Lamex Stadium in Stevenage, Hertfordshire. Foster won via twelfth-round technical knockout (TKO), adding the Commonwealth title to his collection, after referee Mark Lyson called a halt to the contest with 12 seconds remaining in the final round.

He next fought Lucien Reid (8–0–1) on 14 September 2019 at the York Hall in London. Foster retained his British and Commonwealth titles through a majority draw. Two judges scored the bout 114–114, while the third scored it 112–116 in favour of Reid.

Professional boxing record

References

External links

Living people
1997 births
Sportspeople from Walsall
English male boxers
Super-bantamweight boxers
British Boxing Board of Control champions
Commonwealth Boxing Council champions